The Pacific Rim Championships is a major regional biennial gymnastics competition. It is open to teams from member nations of the Pacific Alliance of National Gymnastics Federations, namely Australia, Canada, Chile, China, Chinese Taipei, Colombia, Costa Rica, Hong Kong, Indonesia, Japan, Malaysia, Mexico, New Zealand, Panama, Peru, Philippines, Russia, Singapore, South Korea, Thailand and the United States. Before 2008, the event was known as the Pacific Alliance Championships.

Locations of Pacific Rim Championships

References

External links
 Pacific Rim Championships

 
Gymnastics competitions
Recurring sporting events established in 1982